Hampton Township School District may mean either of

 Hampton Township School District (New Jersey)
 Hampton Township School District (Pennsylvania)